The 1999–2000 English Hockey League season took place from September 1999 until May 2000.

The men's National League was won by Canterbury with the women's National League going to Hightown. The top four clubs entered the Premiership tournament which culminated with men's & women's finals on 1 May. Cannock won the men's Premiership tournament and Hightown claimed the women's Premiership tournament.

The Men's Cup was won by Reading and the Women's Cup was won by Clifton.

Men's National League Premier Division League Standings

Women's National League Premier Division League Standings

Men's Premiership Tournament

Women's Premiership Tournament

Men's Cup (EHA Cup)

Semi-finals

Final 
(Held at the National Hockey Stadium (Milton Keynes) on 7 May)

Women's Cup (EHA Cup)

Quarter-finals

Semi-finals

Final 
(Held at National Hockey Stadium (Milton Keynes) on 7 May)

References 

1999
field hockey
field hockey
2000 in field hockey
1999 in field hockey